Saeed Raad (born 1 March 1944; also Romanized as Said Rād and Sa'id Rād) is an Iranian actor and playwright. He started his career in 1967. Rad left Iran in 1986 and lived in Canada but returned in 2000 to continue his career.

After a minor role in Conquerors of the Desert (1969, M. Zarrindast) he was invited by Amir Naderi for the leading role of his debut, Adieu Friend (1971).

Filmography
 Deadlock, 1973
 Made in Iran, 1979
 Journey of the Stone, 1977
 The Border, 1981
 The Red Line, 1982
 The Imperilled, 1982
 Farmaan, 1982
 Daadshah, 1983
 Crossing the Mine Field, 1983
 Eagles, 1984
 Duel, 2002
 Che, 2014

References

External links

 

1944 births
Living people
People from Tehran
Iranian male film actors
Iranian male television actors